The 2019 DTM Assen round was a motor racing event for the Deutsche Tourenwagen Masters held between 20 and 21 July 2019. The event, part of the 33rd season of the DTM, was held at the TT Circuit Assen in the Netherlands.

Results

Race 1

Qualifying

Race

Race 2

Qualifying

Race

Championship standings

Drivers Championship

Teams Championship

Manufacturers Championship

 Note: Only the top five positions are included for three sets of standings.

See also
 2019 W Series Assen round

References

External links
Official website

|- style="text-align:center"
|width="35%"|Previous race:
|width="30%"|Deutsche Tourenwagen Masters2019 season
|width="40%"|Next race:

Assen DTM
DTM Assen